Olivet is a town in and the county seat of Hutchinson County, South Dakota. The population was 64 at the time of the 2020 census.

History
Olivet was established in 1871 as the county seat. The town was named after Olivet, Michigan, the native home of first settlers. The first county courts were housed in a Methodist church; a permanent courthouse was built in 1881.

Geography
Olivet is located at  (43.241660, -97.675063).

Olivet has been assigned the ZIP code 57052 and the FIPS place code 46900.

Olivet lies north of Lonetree Creek and is on the west bank of the James River.

Highways
The only highway that goes through Olivet is U.S. Highway 18 running east-west. 426 Avenue runs north-south through the town.

Demographics

2010 census
As of the census of 2010, there were 74 people, 39 households, and 27 families residing in the town. The racial makeup of the town was 93.2% White, 2.7% Asian, and 4.1% from two or more races.

There were 39 households, of which 12.8% had children under the age of 18 living with them, 59.0% were married couples living together, 7.7% had a female householder with no husband present, 2.6% had a male householder with no wife present, and 30.8% were non-families. 28.2% of all households were made up of individuals, and 20.6% had someone living alone who was 65 years of age or older. The average household size was 1.90 and the average family size was 2.26.

The median age in the town was 60.5 years. 9.5% of residents were under the age of 18; 2.8% were between the ages of 18 and 24; 5.5% were from 25 to 44; 48.7% were from 45 to 64; and 33.8% were 65 years of age or older. The gender makeup of the town was 48.6% male and 51.4% female.

2000 census
As of the census of 2000, there were 70 people, 37 households, and 22 families residing in the town. The population density was 443.5 people per square mile (168.9/km2). There were 43 housing units at an average density of 272.4 per square mile (103.8/km2). The racial makeup of the town was 90.00% White, 2.86% Native American, and 7.14% from two or more races.

There were 37 households, out of which 8.1% had children under the age of 18 living with them, 54.1% were married couples living together, 2.7% had a female householder with no husband present, and 40.5% were non-families. 37.8% of all households were made up of individuals, and 24.3% had someone living alone who was 65 years of age or older. The average household size was 1.89 and the average family size was 2.45.

In the town, the population was spread out, with 8.6% under the age of 18, 8.6% from 18 to 24, 18.6% from 25 to 44, 32.9% from 45 to 64, and 31.4% who were 65 years of age or older. The median age was 54 years. For every 100 females, there were 112.1 males. For every 100 females age 18 and over, there were 113.3 males.

The median income for a household in the town was $35,625, and the median income for a family was $39,750. Males had a median income of $25,313 versus $22,083 for females. The per capita income for the town was $27,454. There were no families and 3.4% of the population living below the poverty line, including no under eighteens and 6.5% of those over 64.

See also
 List of towns in South Dakota

References

External links

Towns in Hutchinson County, South Dakota
Towns in South Dakota
County seats in South Dakota
Populated places established in 1871
1871 establishments in Dakota Territory